Minova is a town in the Kalehe Territory, Democratic Republic of the Congo. It is an important business center for farm-fishery products. It is very close to Idjwi Island, Masisi Territory, Lake Kivu on its North Western shore and is only 45 km from the Goma city. The town's development is linked with important refugee-related history, including those from Rwanda in 1994, those from Masisi in 1992–1997, and other surrounding areas in northern South Kivu Province, Democratic Republic of the Congo. It is known for being the site of the systematic rape of refugees by DRC troops. WE actually find many local organisations involved in the management of Gender Based Violence (GBV) working tirelessly to restore dignity to women and girls who were raped( Panzi Foundation DRC is one of them, and it is very active in Buzi -Bulenga area).

History
Minova is clearly one point of the Buhavu Chiefdom, headed by the Mwami Ntambuka dynasty, in the Kalehe Territory, South-Kivu Province. 
But the migrations of refugees and Humanitarians made this place to be developed, added to the recent activity of mining/minerals discovered in the surrounding mountains of Minova (Rubaya Mountains, Numbi Mountains, Nyabibwe Mountains, Kalungu Mountains) where Colombo-Tantalite and other minerals were discovered and extracted recently. 
Normally people from Minova are Havu, Hunde, Bashi or Shi, Bahutu, Batembo ethnic groups. They live in a community of farmers, fishermen and small business entrepreneurs. The main products (beans, bananas, pineapple, cassava bread, fish, coffee, minerals, etc) are commercialized with Idjwi Island, Kibuye, Bukavu, Kabare, Walikale, Masisi, Goma and Gisenyi inhabitants. There are Catholic,  Pentecostal and Baptist parishes (cherches) here. There are Also General Hospitals (HGR Minova,Bulenga, Kalungu, Kirotshe,Numbi& Kinyezire) in the Minova catchment Area (Zone de Santé de Minova) where people can receive  quality healthcare services. There are also good schools, primary and secondary, either owned  or managed by religious institutions & the DRC Authorities (WE may cite, Institut Charles-Lwanga, Kalungu, Bulenga, Kirotshe, Bweremana, Nyamasasa, Numbi, Nyabibwe,...where children receive their secondary education  by qualified teachers every year.) .

Since 1994, Minova has grown up  from a village to a large town, primarily due to the influx of refugees (from Rwanda in 1994, from Masisi in 1991-1996 and other surrounding areas) and from the fighting associated with the First and the Second Congo wars and subsequent continued fighting in this eastern area. As of 2012 Minova had grown to incorporate the former village of Butando and Buzi-Bulenga to the northwest.

On June 13, 1999, the fugitive Valérie Bemeriki, a genocidaire and former Radio-Télévision Libre des Milles Collines animatrice, was arrested in Minova.

For three days in 2012, troops of the DRC committed systematic rapes and atrocities against refugee women and girls, who had been run out of Goma, then controlled by M23 rebel troops. Among the perpetrators were members of the US Special Forces-trained 391st Commando Battalion. There was international outrage and UN condemnation of these actions against hundreds of Congolese civilians. In 2014 the DRC Army conducted the "Minova Trial", the largest rape tribunal in DRC history, at which numerous women testified. In the end, only junior officers were convicted at the trial. An international summit was held in London in 2014 to work on actions against rape in warfare. However, the women of Minova are still at risk, and many were attacked again as violence in the area continued.

Geography
Minova is located in north-eastern part of  Kalehe Territory at the head of Kabuno Bay, on the western shore of Lake Kivu. Minova is linked to Bukavu by road (75 km) and Lake Kivu, to Goma (about 40 km) by road and Lake Kivu, to Kibuye and Gisenyi by Lake Kivu, and to Masisi by road. The bed rock consists of metamorphic schists and quartzites.

Climate
In the Köppen-Geiger climate classification system, Minova's climate is tropical, wet, and dry (Aw). It is characterized by a very long rain season and a moderate dry season. This is a mountainous tropical climate and the temperature is under 30 Celsius degrees for the whole year (between 16 and 29 degrees Celsius).

Representation in other media
The American documentary The Testimony (2015) was made about the women and their testifying at the Minova trial.

References

External links
 Map 
https://tel.archives-ouvertes.fr/tel-01646815/document
Paroisse de bobandana/Minova
https://www2.ulb.ac.be/espritlibre/html/el052006/42.html

Populated places in South Kivu